Sigurd Zienau (1921–1976) was a physicist notable for the theory of the polaron.

Education
His undergraduate studies were in mathematics at Birkbeck College. His further studies in physics were very much in the 'old school' European style at the time and he variously studied under Walter Heitler, Wolfgang Pauli, and Herbert Fröhlich.

Career
In 1954, he became an ICI Fellow and lecturer at the University of Liverpool. Then in 1965, he became a Reader in Physics at University College London until his early death at the age of 55. As well as his work on polarons he is remembered for his insightful revisions of Walter Heitler's book Quantum Theory of Radiation and Nevill Francis Mott & Harrie Massey's book The Theory of Atomic Collisions.

See also 
 Polaron
 Edwin Power
 Walter Heitler

References 
 E. A. Power and F. F. Heymann, "Sigurd Zienau," (Obituary) Nature, Vol. 266, pp. 201–202, 1977.

Notes

External links 
 
 Zienau letter to Needham
 History of Physics at UCL with reference to Zienau
 History of Physics at UCL with reference to Zienau, Osborn & Cordero

1976 deaths
Alumni of Birkbeck, University of London
Academics of University College London
Academics of the University of Liverpool
British physicists
1920s births